Ramaz Shengelia (1 January 1957 – 21 June 2012) was a Georgian and Soviet football player.

Club career
Born in Kutaisi, Shengelia started career in his hometown club Torpedo Kutaisi in 1968. He spent four seasons for the club, scoring 29 goals in 75 games in the Soviet First League. Shengelia became the top scorer of the club twice.

After the successful spell in the second strongest team in Georgian SSR, he was invited to Dinamo Tbilisi in 1977. The head coach of the Tbilisi-based club, Nodar Akhalkatsi arrived to Kutaisi in order to monitor the performance of Shengelia and his other teammate Tamaz Kostava. Both of them eventually signed for Dinamo for the following season.

During the debut years, Shengelia has to compete for the starting place with Revaz Chelebadze. However, Shengelia found his place in the team and became the top scorer of the club during 1978 season. Dinamo won the championship for the second time in history, while Shengelia was nominated as Soviet Footballer of the Year ahead of Oleg Blokhin (Dynamo Kyiv) and Georgi Yartsev (Spartak Moscow).

The season of 1981 was the most successful for Shengelia. Dinamo won UEFA Cup Winners' Cup, after defeating Carl Zeiss Jena in the final. Shengelia scored 4 goals during the tournament. At the end of the season he finished 7th in Ballon d'Or nominees. Two of his teammates were also the nominees for the title, as Aleksandre Chivadze finished 8th, while David Kipiani was 11th in the final ranking. Shengelia was again named Soviet Footballer of the Year in 1981.

During the following season, Dinamo lost in the semifinal of UEFA Cup Winners' Cup to Standard Liège. However, Shengelia became the topscorer of the tournament with 6 goals.

Shengelia retired from football in 1988, but he came out of retirement a year later, joining the Swedish club IFK Holmsund with his teammate Tengiz Sulakvelidze. Holmsund competed in the second tier of the championship. During the only season with the club, Shengelia scored 2 goals in 13 appearances.

International career
He played in 26 games scoring 10 goals for the Soviet Union national football team, including performance at the 1982 FIFA World Cup (5 matches, 1 goal). He also represented his country in 5 FIFA World Cup qualification matches.

Later years
After the dissolution of the Soviet Union, Shengelia worked in Georgian national football team as an assistant of Aleksandre Chivadze. Later was invited to Georgian Football Federation by his former coach and then-president of the federation Nodar Akhalkatsi.

Shengelia died of a brain haemorrhage in Tbilisi in June 2012, at the age of 55.

The football stadium in his hometown Kutaisi is named after him.

Club career statistics

Source

1Includes UEFA European Cup, UEFA Cup and UEFA Cup Winners' Cup.
2Includes other competitive competition USSR Federation Cup.

International goals

Score and results list Soviet Union's goal tally first.

Titles

Player

Club
Dinamo Tbilisi
Soviet Top League: 1978
Soviet Cup: 1979
UEFA Cup Winners' Cup: 1980–81

International
UEFA European Under-21 Championship: 1980

Individual
 Soviet Footballer of the Year (2): 1978, 1981
 Soviet Top League top scorer: 1981 (23 goals)
 UEFA Cup Winners' Cup top scorer: 1981–82 (6 goals)
 UEFA European Under-21 Championship top scorer: 1980
 Grigory Fedotov club member
 Merited Master of Sports (1981)
 The best 33 football players of the Soviet Union: 1st (1981); 2nd (1978, 1979, 1980); 3rd (1977)

Ballon d'Or
1981 – 7th

References

External links

Profile in Russian
Pachkoria, Tengiz. In Memoriam. The star of Dinamo Tbilisi Ramaz Shengelia. Georgia online. (Distributed by Ukrayinska Pravda)

1957 births
2012 deaths
Sportspeople from Kutaisi
Mingrelians
Footballers from Georgia (country)
Soviet footballers
Soviet expatriate footballers
Soviet Union international footballers
1982 FIFA World Cup players
Soviet Top League players
FC Dinamo Tbilisi players
FC Torpedo Kutaisi players
Soviet expatriate sportspeople in Sweden
Expatriate footballers in Sweden
IFK Holmsund players
Association football forwards